Dryopteris ludoviciana, the southern woodfern, is fern native to southern United States from Florida west to Texas and as far north as Kentucky and North Carolina.

It is an evergreen in mild climates. Its growth habit is tall and upright with shiny and leathery dark green fronds. It will tolerate dry conditions but will perform best in moist areas. The growth rate is slow to moderate and reaches a mature height at 30–48 inches. D. ludoviciana is hardy in USDA plant hardiness zones 5–10.

References

ludoviciana
Ferns of the United States
Endemic flora of the United States
Flora of the Southeastern United States
Flora of Florida
Flora of Texas
Flora of the Appalachian Mountains
Least concern flora of the United States
Plants described in 1848